George A. Grätzer (born 2 August 1936, in Budapest) is a Hungarian-Canadian mathematician, specializing in lattice theory and universal algebra. He is known for his books on LaTeX and his proof with E. Tamás Schmidt of the Grätzer–Schmidt theorem.

Biography
His father József Grätzer was famous in Hungary as the "Puzzle King" ("rejtvénykirály"). George Grätzer received his PhD from Eötvös Loránd University in 1960 under the supervision of László Fuchs. In 1963 Grätzer and Schmidt published their theorem on the characterization of congruence lattices of algebras. In 1963 Grätzer left Hungary and became a professor at Pennsylvania State University. In 1966 he became a professor at the University of Manitoba and later a Canadian citizen. In 1970 Grätzer became the founder and editor-in-chief of the journal Algebra Universalis. His mathematical articles—over 260, all listed on Research Gate—are widely cited, and he has written several influential books.

Grätzer has received several awards and honours. He is married and has two children (Tom Gratzer and David Gratzer) and five grandchildren.

Awards and honours
 Grünwald Memorial Prize (1967)
 Steacie Prize (1971)
 Fellow of the Royal Society of Canada (1973)
 Jeffery–Williams Prize (1978)
 Zubek Prize (1987)
 Elected Foreign Member of Magyar Tudományos Akadémia (1997)

Publications

More than 260 research articles in mathematics, and 31 books including

 Elmesport egy esztendőre 1959; trans. into English as Train your brain: A year's worth of puzzles 2011
 Universal Algebra 1960
 Lattice Theory 1971
 First Steps in LaTeX 1999
 The Congruences of a Finite Lattice: A Proof-by-Picture Approach 2006
 Math into LaTeX, second edition 2000
 More Math into LaTeX, fourth edition 2007
 Lattice Theory: Foundation 2011
 Practical LaTeX 2014
 More Math into LaTeX, fifth edition 2016
 The Congruences of a Finite Lattice: A Proof-by-Picture Approach, second edition 2016

References

External links
George Grätzer's homepage at U. of Manitoba
Celebrating Professor George A. Grätzer, by Gábor Czédli, Categories and General Algebraic Structures with Applications, Volume 11, Special Issue Dedicated to Prof. George A. Grätzer.

20th-century Hungarian mathematicians
21st-century Hungarian mathematicians
Fellows of the Royal Society of Canada
Canadian mathematicians
Hungarian emigrants to Canada
Eötvös Loránd University alumni
Academic staff of the University of Manitoba
1936 births
Living people